A wave-piercing boat hull has a very fine bow, with reduced buoyancy in the forward portions. When a wave is encountered, the lack of buoyancy means the hull pierces through the water rather than riding over the top, resulting in a smoother ride than traditional designs, and in diminished mechanical stress on the vessel.  It also reduces a boat's wave-making resistance.

Design theory calls for very long thin hulls, so in practice most are multi-hulls such as catamarans and trimarans. 

The main current usage areas are passenger ferries and naval ships.

See also

 
 
 , later renamed MY Ady Gil
 
 
 , a pioneer of the design
 
 Norwegian Cruise Line -Class Cruise Ships
  hull form
 
 
 : an  racing multihull
 : high-speed trimaran warship

References

Naval architecture
Water waves